Jaylen Smith is the Mayor of Earle, Arkansas. At age 18, he became one of the youngest mayors ever elected in the United States.

Early life and education
Smith graduated from Earle High School in May 2022.

Career
In 2022, running as a Democratic Party candidate, Smith won the election to be the mayor of Earle, Arkansas. He won 235 votes, beating his rival candidate Nemi Matthews, who received 185 votes. He was sworn into office on January 3, 2023. His victory made him the youngest black mayor in US history.  This also made him one of the youngest mayors of any race in the United States. 

Smith's mayoral priorities include:  improving public safety and transportation, beautification and renewal of underused housing, emergency preparedness, and addressing the food desert in Earle. In preparation for his time in public office, Smith was given guidance by Frank Scott Jr., the mayor of Little Rock, Arkansas.

Smith joined President Clinton on stage and was a featured speaker at the 2023 Clinton Global Initiative University Meeting at Vanderbilt University.

Awards and honors
Smith received the President’s Award of the Arkansas Democratic Black Caucus at the organization's 2023 King Kennedy Awards.

See also 
 Michael Sessions
 John Tyler Hammons
 List of first African-American mayors

References

Living people
Mayors of places in Arkansas
21st-century American politicians
21st-century African-American politicians
African-American mayors in Arkansas
Year of birth missing (living people)
People from Crittenden County, Arkansas
Arkansas Democrats